Aegires villosus is a species of sea slugs. It is a dorid nudibranch, a shell-less marine gastropod mollusc in the family Aegiridae.

Distribution 
Widespread Indo-West Pacific species.

Diet
Aegires villosus feeds on calcareous sponges.

References

External links 
 Aegeris villosus on Sea Slug Forum
 Aegeris villosus on Nudi Pixel
 

Aegiridae
Gastropods described in 1905